Estadio General Andrés Rodríguez is a multi-use stadium in Asunción, Paraguay.  It is currently used mostly for football matches and is the home stadium of Club Cerro Corá.  The stadium holds 6,000 people.

Multi-purpose stadiums in Paraguay
Football venues in Asunción
Sports venues in Asunción